Ilya Vorotnikov may refer to:
 Ilya Vorotnikov (footballer, born 1986)
 Ilya Vorotnikov (footballer, born 2001)